The 9th Independent Battery Wisconsin Light Artillery was an artillery battery that served in the Union Army during the American Civil War.  It was often referred to as "Lyons' Pinery Battery".

Service
The battery was organized at Burlington, Wisconsin and mustered in for three years on January 27, 1862, under the command of Captain Cyrus H. Johnson.  It was mustered out on September 30, 1865, at Fort Leavenworth, Kansas.

Detailed service
Moved to St. Louis, Missouri, March 18–19, then to Fort Leavenworth, Kansas, April 3. March to Denver City, Colorado Territory, via Fort Kearney and Julesburg, April 26-June 2. Right Section moved to Fort Union, New Mexico Territory, June 3. Left Section moved to Fort Larned June 15 and garrison duty there until December 1864. Right Section moved to Colorado Territory July 5, 1862, and duty there with Center Section until April 26, 1864, then moved to Council Grove, Kansas, April 26-May 18, and duty there until August 1864. Engaged in escorting trains and U.S. mail coaches on the Santa Fe Trail. Moved to Fort Riley, Kansas, August. 1864. Action at Smoky Hill Court House May 16, 1864. Defense of Fort Larned July 17, 18, and 19, 1863 (Left Section). Curtis' Campaign against Price in Missouri and Arkansas October 1864. Big Blue and State Line October 22. Westport October 23. Engagement on the Marmiton (or Battle of Charlot) October 25. Mine Creek, Little Osage River, October 25. Battery consolidated at Fort Leavenworth, Kansas, December 1864. Veteran battery organized January 27, 1865. One section ordered to Fort Scott March 26, and duty there until June 18, then moved to Fort Riley and Fort Zarah.

Casualties
The battery lost a total of 6 enlisted men during service, all due to disease.

Commanders
 Captain Cyrus H. Johnson
 Captain James H. Dodge

See also

 List of Wisconsin Civil War Units
 Wisconsin in the American Civil War

References
 Dyer, Frederick H.  A Compendium of the War of the Rebellion (Des Moines, IA:  Dyer Pub. Co.), 1908.
Attribution
 

Military units and formations established in 1862
Military units and formations disestablished in 1865
Units and formations of the Union Army from Wisconsin
1862 establishments in Wisconsin
Artillery units and formations of the American Civil War